Darýa Semýonowa (born 28 May 2002) is a Turkmenistan swimmer. She competed in the women's 100 metre breaststroke event at the 2016 Summer Olympics. In 2019, she represented Turkmenistan at the 2019 World Aquatics Championships in Gwangju, South Korea. She competed in the women's 50 metre breaststroke and women's 100 metre breaststroke events.

References

External links
 

2002 births
Living people
Turkmenistan female swimmers
Olympic swimmers of Turkmenistan
Swimmers at the 2016 Summer Olympics
Female breaststroke swimmers
Swimmers at the 2020 Summer Olympics